Obstetrical & Gynecological Survey is a monthly peer-reviewed medical journal covering obstetrics and gynaecology. It was established in 1946 and is published by Wolters Kluwer. The editors-in-chief are Lee A. Learman (Florida Atlantic University), Aaron B. Caughey (Oregon Health & Science University), and Mary E. Norton (University of California, San Francisco). According to the Journal Citation Reports, the journal has a 2014 impact factor of 1.863, ranking it 38th out of 79 journals in the category "Obstetrics & Gynecology".

References

External links

Wolters Kluwer academic journals
Obstetrics and gynaecology journals
Publications established in 1946
Monthly journals
English-language journals